Tough All Over is an album by American rock band John Cafferty and the Beaver Brown Band, released in 1985.

It was first released in 1985 and was Cafferty's first attempt to pull his band away from the Eddie and the Cruisers franchise; it was later re-released with a different album cover and "The Voice of Eddie and the Cruisers" added to the title.

The album peaked at No. 40 on the Billboard 200.

Critical reception
The Rolling Stone Album Guide deemed Tough All Over "grandiloquent claptrap."

Track listing
All songs written by John Cafferty.

"Voice of America's Sons" - 4:35
"Tough All Over" - 4:31
"C-I-T-Y" - 3:28
"Where the Action Is" - 2:52
"Dixieland" - 3:55
"Strangers in Paradise" - 4:23
"Small Town Girl" - 4:14
"More Than Just One of the Boys" - 3:17
"Tex-Mex (Crystal Blue)" - 4:39

Singles
The album had four singles released from it. "Voice of America's Sons" was released after being included on the soundtrack to the 1986 film Cobra.

 "Tough All Over" (1985) (#22 US, #1 US Rock)
 "C-I-T-Y" (1985) (#18 US)
 "Small Town Girl" (1985) (#64 US)
 "Voice of America's Sons" (1986) (#62 US)

Personnel
Bass – Pat Lupo
Drums – Kenny Jo Silva
Guitar – Gary Gramolini
Keyboards – Robert Nicholas Cotoia
Saxophone – Michael Antunes
Vocals, Rhythm Guitar – John Cafferty

References

1985 albums
John Cafferty & The Beaver Brown Band albums
Scotti Brothers Records albums